Emil Hultman  (25 December 1880–1 August 1933) was a Swedish politician. He was a member of the Centre Party. In 1929, Hultman was a member of the second chamber of the Swedish Riksdag from the Gävleborg county constituency.

References

This article was initially translated from the Swedish Wikipedia article.

Centre Party (Sweden) politicians
1880 births
Year of death missing